Anselmo Hermenegildo Joaquin Atienza (April 21, 1909 – 1989) was a Filipino politician. He served as 13th Mayor of Manila (1944–1945) and as a member of the Philippine House of Representatives (1946–1952). His term as mayor coincided with the Liberation of Manila. He was previously the Vice Mayor of Manila (1940–1944) and a member of the Manila City Council (1934–1940).

Career
Atienza topped the Philippine Bar Examination in 1932 as a student at the University of the Philippines. During World War II, he was imprisoned by the Japanese in Fort Santiago, alongside guerilla leader . After the war, he was elected to the 1st Congress of the Philippines for Manila's second district. He became a strong opponent of the amnesty granted to collaborationists with the Japanese occupation. In 1949, he introduced House Bill No. 2613, the Reciprocity Immigration Bill, which would have barred Australians from the country in response to the treatment of Lorenzo Gamboa under the White Australia policy. He was re-elected in the same year, this time representing the newly-established 4th district of Manila. However, he was unseated in 1952 upon the annulment of his election due to an electoral protest.

Personal life
His nephew Lito Atienza also became Mayor of Manila.

Legacy
An elementary school of the Division of City Schools - Manila (under DepEd) located in Baseco Compound, Port Area, Manila was named after him.

References

|-

|-

|-

1909 births
1989 deaths
Mayors of Manila
Members of the House of Representatives of the Philippines from Manila
University of the Philippines alumni
Manila City Council members
Hermenegildo Atienza